Associated British Engineering plc is a United Kingdom-based engineering company. The company is listed on the FTSE Fledgling Index of the London Stock Exchange under the ticker ASBE in the industrial engineering sector.

References

External links 
http://www.abeplc.co.uk

Companies listed on the London Stock Exchange
Engineering companies of the United Kingdom